Holly Wright (born July 13, 1941) is an American photographer. After a brief career as a television actress, she gained recognition as a fine art photographer. Her work is included in numerous museum collections, including the Metropolitan Museum of Art and the Yale University Art Gallery.

Early life

Wright was born Holly McIntire in New York City. Her parents were the actors John McIntire and Jeanette Nolan. 

In her early 20s, Wright appeared in two episodes of the television series Wagon Train with her parents. She also appeared in minor roles in the series Gunsmoke, Dr. Kildare and Breaking Point. 

Following her acting career, Wright studied English at the University of California Los Angeles, receiving a BA Degree, and then at the University of Iowa where she received an MFA degree in photography. In 1969 she married the poet Charles Wright.

Photography career
For her 1988 solo show at the Corcoran Gallery, Wright exhibited 30 enlarged photos of her hands that appeared to be nude torsos at first glance. The Washington Post called the work "artistically compelling and technically superb."

Wright's work is included in the collections of the Metropolitan Museum of Art, New York, the Fralin Museum of Art at the University of Virginia, the Museum of Fine Arts Houston, the Allen Memorial Art Museum at Oberlin College, the Ringling Museum, the Yale University Art Gallery and the New York Public Library.

References

Living people
1941 births
20th-century American photographers
21st-century American photographers
20th-century American women artists
21st-century American women artists
20th-century American actresses